The Kerguelen Islands are part of the Southern Indian Ocean Islands tundra ecoregion that includes several subantarctic islands. In this cold climate plant life is mainly limited to grasses, mosses and lichens, although the islands are also known for the indigenous edible Kerguelen cabbage. The islands are at the Antarctic convergence, where cold water moving up from the Antarctic mixes with the warmer water of the Indian Ocean. As a consequence, marine mammals, especially seals, and seabirds and penguins are numerous.

Fauna

Mammals
Seals and fur seals:

 Southern elephant seal (Mirounga leonina)
 Antarctic fur seal (Arctophoca gazella)
 Leopard seal (Hydrurga leptonyx) occasional.

Cetaceans:

 Commerson's dolphin (Cephalorhynchus commersonii)
 D -type Orca (Orcinus orca).
 Humpback whale (Megaptera novaeangliae)
 Southern right whale (Eubalaena australis), etc.

Introduced land mammals: 

 Bizet sheep. Approximately 3,500 semi-wild sheep live on Ile Longue; their main purpose is to provide meat for the scientific personnel stationed on the islands. Oddly, the Kerguelen flock of sheep, which are known as Bizet sheep, are an endangered breed in continental France from where they originated. The sheep suffer a high mortality rate at birth (~25%), because they have not been able to adjust their reproductive cycle to coincide with the seasons of the southern hemisphere, resulting in mothers giving birth during the southern winters when food is less abundant.
 Mouflons (mountain sheep).  Numbering approximately 100 or so individuals, they originated from the island of Corsica, and were introduced in 1959.  The Kerguelen population was restricted to Haute Island in the Golfe du Morbihan. As part of ongoing efforts to remove introduced species, the population was eradicated by 2012.
 Reindeer. Reindeer were introduced to Ile des Rennes (Reindeer Island), also called Ile Australia, by the Norwegians. Reindeer are excellent swimmers and they soon found their way to the main island of La Grande Terre a short distance away.  Today the reindeer of the Kerguelen islands number around 4,000 individuals. They have been able to survive due to their ability to extract sufficient nutrients from the islands' supply of lichens and mosses; however, their presence has had a negative impact on the flora of the archipelago.  They form the only such population in the southern hemisphere, apart from a similarly introduced reindeer population on South Georgia which was eradicated in 2013.
 Rabbits. These small lagomorphs were brought in from South Africa in 1874.  They were reintroduced on a second occasion later. The rationale was to provide a fresh food source to sailors who might become shipwrecked. Rabbits have devastated the islands' plant communities, and have caused serious erosion in places where their numbers have exploded – mostly the eastern half of the islands, where population densities have reached 40+ per acre in some places.  To date, the western and northwestern limits of the islands have been spared due to a less hospitable climate.  The off-lying islands surrounding the archipelago have also been spared.
 Rats.
 Cats. The islands are home to a population of feral cats descended from ships' cats kept by sailors to control the rat population. The cats live mainly on rabbits and seabirds.

Birds

Penguins: 
King penguin (Aptenodytes patagonicus)
Gentoo penguin (Pygoscelis papua)
Southern rockhopper penguin (Eudyptes chrysocome)
Macaroni penguin (Eudyptes chrysolophus)

Seabirds:
Albatross
Sheathbills
Cormorants
Petrels
Seagulls
Prions
Skuas
Terns

The Kerguelen Islands are covered by France's ratification of the international Agreement on the Conservation of Albatrosses and Petrels, drawn up under the auspices of the Convention on Migratory Species.

Anseriformes:
Eaton's pintail (Anas eatoni)
Mallard (Anas platyrhynchos) introduced

Fish
In the 1950s and 1960s, Edgar Albert de la Rue, a French geologist began the introduction of several species of salmonids. Of the seven species introduced, only brook trout  and brown trout  survived to establish wild populations. Brook trout occupy head water streams, while brown trout have established both resident stream and robust anadromous populations throughout the islands.

Flora

Land vegetation

The coastal regions, up to an altitude of about 50 m, are generally covered with low herbaceous vegetation, and are classified as tundra. Higher up, rocky ground dominates and the vegetation is rarer, limited to scattered tufts and mosses and lichens.

There are no trees or shrubs on the islands. This was not always the case, however. Fossilized tree trunks of the family Araucariaceae can be found in certain sediments, geological witnesses of times when Kerguelen had a warmer climate than today.

Originally, the main type of low altitude vegetation consisted of a thick and continuous carpet of azorellae (Azorella selago) on which could be established various other species such as the famous Kerguelen cabbage, Pringlea antiscorbutica (family Brassicaceae). The azorella (Apiaceae) had a pillow-shaped growth: the year's growth forming a tight layer which superimposed itself on the previous year's growth. The species Lyallia kerguelensis (Hectorellaceae), the only strictly endemic species of the archipelago, has a similar growth pattern. The pillows of azorellae could exceed 1 meter in thickness and adjacent plants could join to form a continuous sheet. Walking on this kind of vegetation was very difficult and was environmentally harmful. On the other hand, this tender medium was ideal for certain species of marine birds which could dig nest burrows there.

The introduction and proliferation of rabbits destroyed this habitat, which was replaced by a monospecific meadow constituted of a plant resembling a small Salad Burnet, Acaena adscendens (Rosaceae). Today one can find the carpets of azorellae only on the islands and islets undamaged by rabbits. The Kerguelen cabbage underwent practically the same fate.
The establishment of other mammals also had consequences on the vegetation: consumption of the seeds of the Kerguelen cabbage by mice, reducing its regeneration capacities, consumption of the lichens by reindeer, etc.

In the flat bottoms and close to brooks, the ground is often soaked. A boggy vegetation mainly constituted of mosses may develop there. This vegetation can appear homogeneous on the surface but can be covering quicksand, in which hikers may sink to the waist.

Marine vegetation

 
Unlike the terrestrial vegetation which is very poorly developed, the marine flora is flourishing, in particular thanks to the presence of giant brown algae: the kelp (Macrocystis pyrifera), which form true underwater forests, and the cochayuyo (Durvillaea antarctica), which covers most of the rock coasts.

The Macrocystis are one of the largest types of marine macroalgae, the species can grow to lengths of 50 meters, forming undersea forests in hard-bottom, subtidal areas. Attached to the bottom by branched holdfasts, the algae grow up to the surface in the form of columns made of several dozen interwoven cords.  They then spread out widely on the surface thanks to floaters placed at the base of multiple slings similar to corrugated sheets. The kelp can cover wide areas where navigation is practically impossible because the thin straps can get entangled in ships' propellers and block them. The kelp forests in the Kerguelen Islands are home to relatively few vertebrates but many colourful invertebrates as well as a great diversity of red algae. The storms regularly tear off large quantities of giant algae that wash ashore and rot on the beaches in the form of a mattress which can reach several meters thickness. These wash-ups of algae form one of the essential bases of the local ecosystem.

References